The following television stations broadcast on digital channel 25 in the United States:

 K25AD-D in Victorville, etc., California, on virtual channel 25
 K25BP-D in Billings, Montana
 K25CG-D in Aberdeen, Washington, on virtual channel 13, which rebroadcasts KCPQ
 K25CK-D in Montpelier, Idaho
 K25CP-D in Tulia, Texas
 K25CQ-D in Childress, Texas
 K25CV-D in Hays, Kansas
 K25DH-D in Meadview, Arizona
 K25EN-D in Gold Beach, Oregon
 K25FI-D in Mora, New Mexico
 K25FP-D in Ellensburg, Washington
 K25FR-D in Elko, Nevada
 K25FZ-D in Grand Junction, Colorado
 K25GA-D in Redmond/Prineville, Oregon
 K25GE-D in Durango, Colorado
 K25GK-D in Joshua Tree, California
 K25GM-D in Newport, Nebraska
 K25GS-D in Manti and Ephraim, Utah, on virtual channel 8, which rebroadcasts KTTA-LD
 K25GY-D in Beryl/Modena/New Castle, Utah
 K25GZ-D in Holyoke, Colorado, on virtual channel 9, which rebroadcasts KUSA
 K25HG-D in Preston, Idaho, on virtual channel 11, which rebroadcasts KBYU-TV
 K25HJ-D in Hornsby Ranch, etc., New Mexico
 K25HO-D in Wolf Point, Montana
 K25HV-D in Truth or Consequences, New Mexico
 K25II-D in Redwood Falls, Minnesota, on virtual channel 25
 K25IM-D in Medford, Oregon
 K25IP-D in Malad City, Idaho
 K25IW-D in Golconda, Nevada
 K25IX-D in Huntsville, etc., Utah, on virtual channel 2, which rebroadcasts KUTV
 K25JJ-D in Fillmore/Meadow, etc., Utah
 K25JO-D in Altus, Oklahoma
 K25JQ-D in May, etc., Oklahoma
 K25JT-D in Blanding/Monticello, Utah, on virtual channel 30, which rebroadcasts KUCW
 K25JW-D in Hugo, etc., Oregon
 K25KR-D in Round Mountain, Nevada
 K25KS-D in The Dalles, Oregon, on virtual channel 8, which rebroadcasts KGW
 K25KV-D in Huntington, Utah
 K25KY-D in Fresno, California
 K25KZ-D in Kalispell, Montana
 K25LA-D in Fort Morgan, Colorado, on virtual channel 29
 K25LE-D in Las Animas, Colorado
 K25LF-D in Philipsburg, Montana
 K25LG-D in Tyler, Texas
 K25LH-D in Fishlake Resort, Utah
 K25LI-D in Wright, Wyoming
 K25LJ-D in Tres Piedras, New Mexico
 K25LM-D in Great Falls, Montana
 K25LO-D in Hamilton, Montana
 K25LU-D in Mesquite, Nevada
 K25LY-D in Fargo, North Dakota
 K25MG-D in Flagstaff, Arizona, on virtual channel 3, which rebroadcasts KTVK
 K25MK-D in Camp Verde, Arizona, on virtual channel 12, which rebroadcasts KPNX
 K25MP-D in Bonners Ferry, Idaho
 K25MR-D in Snowmass Village, Colorado
 K25MW-D in Baudette, Minnesota
 K25MZ-D in Conrad, Montana
 K25NI-D in Mapleton, Oregon
 K25NJ-D in Sweetgrass, etc., Montana
 K25NK-D in Rochester, Minnesota
 K25NN-D in Nephi, Utah, on virtual channel 30, which rebroadcasts KUCW
 K25NO-D in Gasquet, California
 K25NY-D in Bridgeport, Washington
 K25NZ-D in Lewiston, Idaho
 K25OA-D in Dillon, Montana
 K25OB-D in San Antonio, Texas
 K25OG-D in Falls City, Nebraska
 K25OI-D in Soda Springs, Idaho
 K25OJ-D in La Grande, Oregon
 K25OK-D in Yoncalla, Oregon
 K25OM-D in Prescott, Arizona, on virtual channel 10, which rebroadcasts KSAZ-TV
 K25OO-D in Pendleton, Oregon
 K25OP-D in Kellogg, Idaho
 K25OR-D in McCall, Idaho
 K25OS-D in Thompson Falls, Montana
 K25OU-D in Brookings, South Dakota
 K25OW-D in Marysvale, Utah
 K25OX-D in Hagerman, Idaho
 K25OY-D in Summit County, Utah
 K25OZ-D in East Price, Utah, on virtual channel 14, which rebroadcasts KJZZ-TV
 K25PA-D in St. George, Utah
 K25PC-D in Gateway, Colorado
 K25PD-D in Parowan/Enoch/Paragonah, Utah
 K25PE-D in Decorah, Iowa
 K25PF-D in Delta, Oak City, etc, Utah
 K25PG-D in Strong City, Oklahoma
 K25PH-D in Roosevelt, Utah, on virtual channel 16, which rebroadcasts KUPX-TV
 K25PI-D in Kasilof, Alaska
 K25PJ-D in Chloride, Arizona
 K25PL-D in Ridgecrest, California, on virtual channel 4, which rebroadcasts KNBC
 K25PM-D in Helper, Utah
 K25PO-D in Holbrook, Idaho
 K25PP-D in Eureka, Nevada
 K25PQ-D in Fallon, Nevada
 K25PT-D in Sargents, Colorado
 K25PU-D in Mina/Luning, Nevada
 K25PV-D in Yakima, Washington
 K25PX-D in Lund & Preston, Nevada
 K25PY-D in Leadore, Idaho
 K25PZ-D in Alexandria, Louisiana
 K25QA-D in Odessa, Texas
 K25QB-D in Lucerne Valley, California, on virtual channel 25
 K25QD-D in Tohatchi, New Mexico
 K25QI-D in Woody Creek, Colorado
 K25QK-D in Anchorage, Alaska
 K25QL-D in Chico, California
 K25QS-D in Cortez, Colorado
 K25QT-D in Columbia, Missouri
 K28GQ-D in Rural Iron, etc., Utah
 K38IU-D in Susanville, etc., California
 K50MY-D in Cody, Wyoming
 KAUN-LD in Sioux Falls, South Dakota
 KCKW-LD in Eugene, Oregon
 KCTL-LD in Livingston, Texas, to move to channel 29, on virtual channel 25, which rebroadcasts KTWC-LD
 KDAS-LD in Santa Rosa, California
 KDKA-TV in Pittsburgh, Pennsylvania, on virtual channel 2
 KDVD-LD in Globe, Arizona, on virtual channel 50
 KEZI in Oakridge, Oregon
 KFDF-CD in Fort Smith, Arkansas
 KFKY-LD in Springfield, Missouri
 KFLL-LD in Boise, Idaho
 KFVE in Kailua-Kona, Hawaii
 KGCT-CD in Nowata, Oklahoma
 KGET-TV in Bakersfield, California
 KHAX-LP in Vista, California, on virtual channel 17, which rebroadcasts KBNT-CD
 KHPZ-CD in Round Rock, Texas
 KING-TV in Seattle, Washington, on virtual channel 5
 KINT-TV in El Paso, Texas
 KJNK-LD in Minneapolis, Minnesota, on virtual channel 25
 KJPO-LD in Tonopah, Arizona, on virtual channel 25
 KKRA-LD in Rapid City, South Dakota
 KLFA-LD in Santa Maria, California
 KMCI-TV in Lawrence, Kansas, an ATSC 3.0 station, on virtual channel 38
 KMDE in Devils Lake, North Dakota
 KMSB in Tucson, Arizona
 KMYA-LD in Sheridan, Arkansas
 KNPL-LD in North Platte, Nebraska
 KOAA-TV in Pueblo, Colorado
 KOIN in Portland, Oregon, on virtual channel 6
 KOPS-LD in Beaumont, Texas
 KOVR in Stockton, California, on virtual channel 13
 KPVM-LD in Las Vegas / Pahrump, Nevada
 KPXD-TV in Arlington, Texas, on virtual channel 68
 KQDF-LD in Santa Fe, New Mexico
 KQET in Watsonville, California
 KRHT-LD in Redding, California
 KRRI-LD in Reno, Nevada
 KSVN-CD in Ogden, Utah, on virtual channel 25
 KTEL-TV in Carlsbad, New Mexico
 KTIN in Fort Dodge, Iowa
 KTTZ-TV in Lubbock, Texas
 KVCT in Victoria, Texas
 KVEA in Corona, California, on virtual channel 52
 KWKB in Iowa City, Iowa
 KWTV-DT in Oklahoma City, Oklahoma
 KXCO-LD in Refugio, Texas
 KXNW in Eureka Springs, Arkansas
 KYAZ in Katy, Texas, on virtual channel 51
 W25AA-D in Onancock, Virginia
 W25AT-D in Tupper Lake, New York
 W25BT-D in Monkton, Vermont
 W25DQ-D in Key West, Florida
 W25ED-D in Albany, Georgia
 W25EM-D in Columbus, Georgia
 W25ER-D in Vero Beach, Florida
 W25FC-D in Jasper, Alabama
 W25FG-D in Philadelphia, Pennsylvania, on virtual channel 36
 W25FH-D in Fort Wayne, Indiana
 W25FI-D in Maplewood, Ohio
 W25FP-D in Young Harris, Georgia
 W25FR-D in Clarksburg, West Virginia
 W25FS-D in Clarksburg, West Virginia
 W25FW-D in Columbus, Georgia
 W25FX-D in Sutton, West Virginia
 WAKA in Selma, Alabama
 WATL in Atlanta, Georgia, on virtual channel 36
 WATN-TV in Memphis, Tennessee
 WAWD in Fort Walton Beach, Florida
 WBEC-TV in Boca Raton, Florida, on virtual channel 63
 WBNM-LD in Louisville, Kentucky
 WCIV in Charleston, South Carolina
 WCPX-LD in Columbus, Ohio
 WCQT-LD in Cullman, Alabama
 WCWW-LD in South Bend, Indiana
 WDKA in Paducah, Kentucky
 WEDK-LD in Effingham, Illinois
 WEEK-TV in Peoria, Illinois
 WFEF-LD in Orlando, Florida, on virtual channel 50
 WFTT-TV in Venice, Florida, on virtual channel 62
 WJAR at Providence, Rhode Island
 WJFB in Lebanon, Tennessee, on virtual channel 44
 WJGP-LD in Kalamazoo, Michigan
 WJGV-CD in Palatka, Florida
 WJZY in Belmont, North Carolina, on virtual channel 46
 WJXE-LD in Gainesville, Florida
 WLFB in Bluefield, West Virginia
 WLMS-LD in Columbus, Mississippi
 WLPB-TV in Baton Rouge, Louisiana
 WMAO-TV in Greenwood, Mississippi
 WMEB-TV in East Eddington, Maine
 WMYT-TV in Rock Hill, South Carolina, uses WJZY's spectrum, on virtual channel 55
 WNUV in Baltimore, Maryland, an ATSC 3.0 station, on virtual channel 54
 WNYP-LD in Port Jervis, New York
 WOGC-CD in Holland, Michigan
 WPNE-TV in Green Bay, Wisconsin
 WQHA in Aguada, Puerto Rico, on virtual channel 50
 WQIX-LD in Vidalia, Georgia
 WQOW in Eau Claire, Wisconsin
 WRNN-TV in New Rochelle, New York, uses WWOR-TV's spectrum, on virtual channel 48
 WRTV in Indianapolis, Indiana, on virtual channel 6
 WSKA in Corning, New York
 WTTW in Chicago, Illinois, on virtual channel 11
 WTVU-CD in Syracuse, New York
 WTXF-TV (DRT) in Allentown, Pennsylvania, on virtual channel 29
 WUEK-LD in Canton, Ohio, on virtual channel 26
 WUNF-TV in Asheville, North Carolina
 WUNK-TV in Greenville, North Carolina, an ATSC 3.0 station.
 WUPX-TV in Richmond, Kentucky
 WVAD-LD in Chesapeake, Virginia
 WWBK-LD in Richmond, Virginia
 WWOR-TV in Secaucus, New Jersey, on virtual channel 9
 WXCB-CD in Delaware, Ohio, on virtual channel 39, which rebroadcasts WOCB-CD
 WXXV-TV in Gulfport, Mississippi
 WXYZ-TV in Detroit, Michigan, on virtual channel 7
 WYAT-LD in Martinsville, Virginia
 WYHB-CD in Chattanooga, Tennessee
 WYOU in Waymart, Pennsylvania
 WZRB in Columbia, South Carolina

The following stations, which are no longer licensed, formerly broadcast on digital channel 25:
 K25HD-D in Bullhead City, Arizona
 K25LT-D in Cortez, Colorado
 K25ND-D in Mount Vernon, Texas
 KLDT-LD in Lufkin, Texas
 W25EG-D in Columbus, Georgia
 WQEP-LD in Augusta, Georgia
 WYCC in Chicago, Illinois

References

25 digital